F Troop is a satirical American television sitcom western about U.S. soldiers and American Indians in the Wild West during the 1860s that originally aired for two seasons on ABC. It debuted in the United States on September 14, 1965, and concluded its run on April 6, 1967, with a total of 65 episodes. The first season of 34 episodes was broadcast in black-and-white, and the second season was in color.

The series relied heavily on character-based humor, verbal and visual gags, slapstick, physical comedy, and burlesque comedy. The series played fast and loose with historical events and persons, and often parodied them for comical effect. Some indirect references were made to the culture of the 1960s, such as a "Playbrave Club" (a parody of a Playboy Club) and two rock and roll bands (one which performs songs written in the 1960s).

Setting and story

F Troop is set at Fort Courage—a fictional United States Army outpost in the Old West, from near the end of the American Civil War in 1865 to at least 1867. A town of the same name is adjacent to the fort. Fort Courage was named for the fictitious General Sam Courage (portrayed by Cliff Arquette). The fort is constructed in the stockade style typically found in most American Westerns.

The commanding officer is the gallant although laughably clumsy Captain Wilton Parmenter (Ken Berry), who is descended from a long line of distinguished military officers. He is awarded the Medal of Honor after accidentally instigating the final Civil War charge at the Battle of Appomattox Court House. Only a private in the Quartermaster Corps, he is ordered to fetch the commanding officer's laundry (presumably General Grant's). As Parmenter rides away to get the laundry, he repeatedly sneezes. A group of Union soldiers mistake his sneezing for an order to charge, turning the tide of the battle and "earning" Parmenter the nickname "The Scourge of Appomattox". He also is awarded the Purple Heart after he is accidentally pricked in the chest by his father and commanding officer while receiving his first medal, making him known as "the only soldier in history to get a medal for getting a medal." His superiors reward his action by promoting him to captain, only to give Parmenter command of remote Fort Courage, a dumping ground for the Army's "least useful" soldiers and misfits; the Secretary of War (William Woodson) notes, "Why, the Army sent them out there hoping they'd all desert." Indeed, of the three commanding officers at Fort Courage before Captain Parmenter, two did desert, while the third suffered a nervous breakdown.

Much of the humor of the series derives from the scheming of Captain Parmenter's somewhat crooked but amiable non-commissioned officers, Sergeant Morgan O'Rourke (Forrest Tucker) and Corporal Randolph Agarn (Larry Storch). They, in league with the local (fictitious) American Indian tribe, the Hekawis—led by Chief Wild Eagle (Frank de Kova)—are forever seeking to expand and conceal their shady business deals covertly and collectively referred to as "O'Rourke Enterprises". Initially, rations and pay were drawn for 30 men at Fort Courage, though only 17 are actually accounted for (the other 13, according to O'Rourke, are Indian scouts who only come to the fort at night and leave before dawn). The pay of the fictitious scouts is apparently used to help finance the dealings of O'Rourke Enterprises. Although O'Rourke and Agarn try to take full advantage of Captain Parmenter's innocence and naïveté, they are also very fond of and fiercely protective of him, and woe be to anyone attempting to harm him. Parmenter also struggles to exert his authority outside the ranks. Very bashful, he tries to escape the matrimonial plans of his girlfriend, shopkeeper–postmistress Jane Angelica Thrift, known locally as "Wrangler Jane" (played by Melody Patterson, who was awarded the role at the age 16, due to a forged birth certificate)—though he becomes a bit more affectionate toward her during the second season.

The episode "Captain Parmenter, One Man Army"  reveals that all of the soldiers (troopers) of "F Troop" have been at Fort Courage for at least 20 months, meaning they spent at least part of the Civil War there. They are so incompetent that when they are formed into a firing squad in the episode titled "The Day They Shot Agarn", all of their shots miss Agarn despite the fact they are standing only a few yards from him. The most common running gag through both seasons of the series (shown in every first season opening except for the pilot episode) involves the fort's lookout tower. Every time the cannon is fired in salute, the lit fuse burns out. Corporal Agarn or Private Dobbs then steps up and kicks the cannon's right wheel, collapsing the cannon and causing it to fire off target. The cannonball strikes a support leg of the lookout tower, bringing it crashing to the ground along with the trooper in it (in the opening credits, this coincides with the line in the lyrics, "Before they resume with a bang and a boom.") In one episode, an arrow brings the tower crashing down, and in another, Parmenter yanks down the tower with a lasso. In another episode, musical instruments being played loudly cause the tower to collapse. The fort water tower is also a frequent victim of this sort of gag. In one variation of the tower gag, Vanderbilt, Parmenter, O'Rourke, and Agarn are standing in the water tower platform when a lone Indian, "Bald Eagle" (played by Don Rickles), tries to capture Fort Courage by scaling the tower and jumping on the platform; the combined weight causes the floor to collapse and "Bald Eagle" to be captured. In another variation of the cannon gag, the cannon collapses as it is fired, and blows up the fort's powder magazine, causing Agarn to be saved from a vengeful Chief Geronimo.

Episodes

Characters

Main

F Troop officers and enlisted men
 Captain Wilton Parmenter (Ken Berry) is the so-called "Scourge of the West." As military governor of the territory and commander of Fort Courage, he is credited with keeping the peace (which is in fact really kept by O'Rourke's secret treaty with the Hekawi tribe –- though other tribes seem to fear his reputation). Chief Wild Eagle knows him by a different title: "The Great White Pigeon". When the need to keep up appearances arises, the troopers and the Hekawis stage mock battles to fool Parmenter and outsiders. Parmenter is successful at "keeping the peace"; he just does not know why. He is well-meaning and sweet-natured, although essentially clueless and a bit gullible. He also invariably is kind and encouraging to his men, and always bravely leads them into action, albeit ineptly. A stickler for regulation and proper military conduct, he checks the Army Manual for even the oddest situations, such as "If a soldier is captured by horse". A perpetual klutz, Parmenter forever is jabbing himself, pinching his fingers in or on something, banging into, tripping over, or knocking things over. He cannot dismount a horse properly, and frequently becomes entangled with his ceremonial sword. Parmenter, born in Philadelphia, comes from a "proud family" with a "great military tradition." Among his ancestors are his first cousin Major Achilles Parmenter, second cousin Lt. Colonel Hercules Parmenter, uncle Colonel Jupiter Parmenter (Rod McGaughy), his father General Thor Parmenter and his great-grandfather Major Hannibal Parmenter—who was with Gen. George Washington at Valley Forge. By contrast, Corporal Agarn's great-grandfather was a deserter. Jeanette Nolan played Parmenter's visiting mother (no first name given) in "A Fort's Best Friend is Not a Mother". When his sister Daphne Parmenter (Patty Regan) visits the fort, her eyes are on Private Dobbs. O'Rourke frequently calls Captain Parmenter "the Old Man" (in the sense that he is their leader) though Parmenter usually is surprised at being called that because he is fairly young ("What old man?"). In one episode, he receives a medal for accidentally capturing Chief Geronimo, who falls into a bear trap while trying to kill Corporal Agarn. (True to form, Parmenter captures the bear in the trap and then gets trapped in another bear trap.) In "The Majority of Wilton" (near the end of the series), he turns down a promotion to major because it would mean being reassigned to a new command and leaving F Troop.
 Sergeant Morgan Sylvester O'Rourke (Forrest Tucker) is the Sgt. Bilko of his day (as Agarn said to O'Rourke: "When it comes to shifty, sneaky, double dealing ... you're the tops"). Originally from Steubenville, Ohio, he has been in the Army at least 25 years, and it took him either 10 years to become a sergeant or has been a sergeant for 22 years as of his 25th anniversary.  O'Rourke's business dealings involve illegally running the local town saloon and an exclusive-rights treaty with the local Indian tribe (the Hekawi) to sell their "authentic" souvenirs to tourists and for the commercial market through the shady, undercover O'Rourke Enterprises operation. He also tries to find ways to fleece the men out of their pay through different schemes such as finding the men mail-order brides. Though most of his business schemes fail, he apparently is the only competent soldier in F Troop.  O'Rourke is mentioned as a veteran of the Mexican–American War, but nothing is said about the Civil War. In "The Sergeant and the Kid", the tall and rugged O'Rourke shows his romantic side by taking an interest in the widow Molly Walker (Pippa Scott) and her son Joey (Peter Robbins). In "Don't Look Now, But One of Our Cannons is Missing," O'Rourke claims he saved Agarn's life twice—once from drowning and once when a rattlesnake bit him. (Coincidentally, Forrest Tucker actually served in the U.S. Cavalry prior to World War II and played a similar "O'Rourke" cavalry sergeant on Gunsmoke.) Tucker's wife at the time, Mary Fisk, appeared in the series twice. She played Squirrel Girl in "Lieutenant O'Rourke, Front and Center" and Kissing Squaw in "What Are You Doing After the Massacre?". In one St Patricks day episode Forest Tucker played Sgt O'Rourke's father-a stage irishman who is just as much as conman as his son is.
 Corporal Randolph Agarn (Larry Storch) is O'Rourke's somewhat dimwitted sidekick and business partner in the shady O'Rourke Enterprises (his name is a play on both Randolph Scott and John Agar, who were cowboy stars). The character Agarn, originally from Passaic, New Jersey, took six years after enlistment to become a lowly corporal.  At the time of the series, Agarn has been in the cavalry for 10 years, and has been posted to Fort Courage for the last four, apparently spending the Civil War years at Fort Courage. He has impersonated Generals George Washington and Ulysses Grant. However, in dual roles, Storch played numerous lookalike relatives of Agarn, including his French-Canadian cousin Lucky Pierre, his Russian cousin Dmitri Agarnoff and his Mexican bandito cousin Pancho Agarnado, known as "El Diablo." (In the same episode he also played Granny Agarn, Uncle Gaylord Agarn of Tallahassee and Pancho's sister Carmen Agarnado). Confrontational and often overly-emotional in every respect, Agarn frequently collapses in tears with the phrases "Oh, Cap'n!" or "Oh, Sarge!" (depending on whose chest he buries his head in). To get the men to attention, he barks out his trademark loud and exaggerated (but unintelligible) "Aaaaa-aaahh" command.  Whenever he becomes frustrated by something one of the troopers does wrong (which is often), short-tempered Agarn hits him with his hat which, unlike everyone else's, is white. A hypochondriac, Agarn thinks he has contracted the illnesses he reads or hears about or others around him have (including a horse). Agarn was briefly promoted to sergeant in the episode "Lieutenant O'Rourke, Front and Center".  Larry Storch was nominated for an Emmy Award for  outstanding performance by an actor in a leading role in a comedy series in 1967.
 Bugler Private Hannibal Shirley Dobbs (James Hampton) is F Troop's inept bugler, originally from New Orleans, who can only play "Yankee Doodle" and "Dixie" with regularity. Standard U.S. Army tunes such as "Reveille", "Assembly", and "Retreat" are only occasionally played competently. One episode had him playing a song, which Wrangler Jane says is a lovely rendition of "Old Kentucky Home", only for him to say he'd been trying to play "Reveille". A southern "mama's boy", he is also Captain Parmenter's orderly, as well as serving in the fort's cannon crew—usually with disastrous results. Private Dobbs is a personal thorn in Agarn's side, with his regular taunts resulting in Agarn's frequent retort, "I'm warning you, Dobbs!", even threatening him with a court-martial. Dobbs learned how to use a lasso on his mama's alligator farm. Dobbs was briefly promoted to Corporal in the episode "Lieutenant O'Rourke, Front and Center". In one episode O'Rourke saved Dobbs from being married by explaining to a gold-digging mail-order bride that Dobbs was not a rich man!
 Trooper Vanderbilt (Joe Brooks) is the fort's lookout, who seems all but blind even with glasses (20/900 in each eye, according to Agarn) and answers questions from the lookout tower about what he sees with incongruous responses, such as "No, thank you Agarn. I just had my coffee." He once allowed two Indians wearing feather head-dresses to enter the fort unchallenged. Asked why, he replied, "I thought they were turkeys." In another episode he mistakes a flock of turkeys for attacking Indians. In one episode, he shoots his pistol in a crowded barracks—and manages to miss everyone.  Vanderbilt was a bustle inspector in a dress factory before joining the Army. In the running gag that brings the lookout tower crashing to the ground,  the heavyset Vanderbilt is the soldier who comes down with it.
 Trooper Duffy (Bob Steele) is an aged old-time cavalryman with a limp, the result of his "old Alamo injury" acting up again. Duffy claims to be the lone survivor of the siege of the Alamo in 1836, and loves to recount his exploits alongside Davy Crockett and Jim Bowie, "shoulder to shoulder and backs to the wall" roughly 30 years before being in F Troop. (Steele was in fact a Western movie and serial star years earlier, even appearing in With Davy Crockett at the Fall of the Alamo in 1926, some four decades before F Troop). However, no one ever seems to take his claim seriously, and he may be engaged in telling tall tales. Parmenter discovered that Duffy is listed as dead in his service record (as Sergeant O’Rourke noted to Captain Parmenter, Duffy's service record might need some updating).

Townspeople
 "Wrangler" Jane Angelica Thrift (Melody Patterson) is Captain Wilton Parmenter's beautiful but tomboyish, feisty, romantically aggressive Annie Oakley-like girlfriend, dressed in buckskins and a cowgirl hat. She owns Wrangler Jane's Trading Post and runs the U.S. post office in town. She is a telegrapher and the best sharpshooter in the territory. Whenever the fort is attacked she fights alongside everyone else, usually shooting more Indians than everyone else. She is determined to marry the ever-romantically elusive and naïve Parmenter, and is often obliged to rescue him from his various predicaments. When she kisses the very bashful Parmenter, he usually says, "Please, Jane, not in front of the men." In "The Sergeant and the Kid", she replied back, "But there're no men here," to which he replied "Well then, not in front of me.” As part of this running gag, in the same episode after Jane mistakenly kisses Agarn, he says, "Please Jane, not in front of the Captain." While Parmenter is reticent about showing any overt interest in Jane, he does become quite jealous if another man shows any interest in her. However, in "Marriage, Fort Courage Style" (one of the last episodes in the series), Parmenter finally shows a direct interest in Jane. He sets a date three months hence as the beginning of their engagement to be married (Parmenter explains the reason he has hesitated to marry Jane is that the Parmenters as military men are rather hard on their wives). The character had her own theme music; a banjo piece usually played on the soundtrack to cue her entrances, or initial appearance in each episode. For more on Melody Patterson see Development and Production section.

The Hekawi tribe
The Hekawi appear to be a very small tribe consisting of only one small village. They live an indeterminate distance from Fort Courage, though the directions to their camp are described as: "Make right turn at big rock that look like bear, then make left turn at big bear that look like rock.” In "Reunion for O'Rourke", Chief Wild Eagle explains how the tribe got its name: "Many moons ago, tribe leave Massachusetts because Pilgrims ruin neighborhood! Tribe travel west, over stream, over river, over mountain, over mountain, over river, over stream! Then come big day... tribe fall over cliff. That when Hekawi get name. Medicine man say to my ancestor, "I think we lost. Where the heck are we?". "Where the heck are we?" became "We're the Hekawi" (the original name for the tribe in the series, 'Fugawi', was changed after the censors discovered the sentence "Where the Fugawi?").

The Hekawis are 50/50 partners in everything they do with O'Rourke Enterprises. They make most of the company's products, usually in the form of Indian souvenirs (on a commercial scale) and whiskey for the town saloon. They are a peace-loving tribe (mainly due to cowardice), and are self described as "the tribe that invented the peace pipe," "lovers, not fighters," and "proud descendants of cowards." Profit minded, the Hekawis look to be paid when O'Rourke needs them to do something like orchestrate a fake attack on the fort, and haggle over the price and how many braves would be in the attack (when O'Rourke balks at the price, the Chief reminds him that the Apache will gladly make a real attack on the fort for free). Because it had been such a long time, though, since they had been on the "warpath," when the series started, Agarn has to teach the Hekawis how to do a war dance, a clip of which was shown in the first-season opening credits. Anytime the tribe wants to contact the fort, they use smoke signals, which only O'Rourke can read. In one episode (and referred to in another), the Hekawis have a "Playbrave Club" (a parody of the Playboy Club) complete with go-go dancing and 1960s-style music.

As a sly jest based on the myth that Native Americans are the 13th tribe of Israel, many of the Hekawi Indians were played by veteran Yiddish comedians using classic Yiddish shtick. The regular Indian characters (none of whom were played by Native American actors) include:

 Chief Wild Eagle (Frank de Kova) is the shrewd, cranky, but essentially good-natured leader of the Hekawi tribe, and business partner in the shady O'Rourke Enterprises schemes (in "Reunion for O'Rourke" Wild Eagle says he has been chief for 17 years). In spite of his gruff appearance, Wild Eagle said: "Don't let name Wild Eagle fool you. I had changed it from Yellow Chicken". Like all the Indian characters portrayed in F Troop,  he speaks with a mock American Indian accent in a semibroken English dialect stereotypical of American Westerns. Often, O'Rourke, Agarn, Parmenter, and Jane come to him for advice when they have a problem, and Wild Eagle has a wise old Indian saying for every occasion (such as "Wise old Indian say you cannot make a fur coat out of a goose feather"), which he often admits even he does not know the meaning of which or how it applies to the situation at hand. On differing occasions, he says he is the son of Crazy Horse, the brother-in-law of Sitting Bull, and the cousin of Geronimo.  De Kova and the character of Chief Wild Eagle became important enough by the beginning of the second season as to merit listing in the show's opening credits sequence.
 Crazy Cat (Don Diamond) is Chief Wild Eagle's goofy assistant and heir apparent. He often speculates on when he will become chief, but is subsequently rebuked by Chief Wild Eagle. Appearing sporadically in the early first-season episodes, he became a regularly featured character later in the first season, as Roaring Chicken and Medicine Man were phased out of the series.  "Craze" (as O'Rourke and Agarn sometimes call him) does become "acting chief" in the episode titled, "Our Brave in F Troop" (when O'Rourke and Agarn have to somehow sneak Wild Eagle into Fort Courage to see the Army dentist so he can get his tooth pulled).  Crazy Cat humorously comments on the situation, "When Wild Eagle away, Crazy Cat play."

Recurring
 Happy Bear/Smokey Bear (Ben Frommer) is an overweight, usually silent Hekawi brave in black braids and a fire ranger's hat (a parody of Smokey Bear). In the first season, Frommer appears (usually uncredited) as Happy Bear, sometimes as Smokey Bear, once as Papa Bear, as Red Arrow, and a few times without a name. In the second season, he appears solely as Smokey Bear. Overall, Frommer appeared in 52 episodes.
 Trooper Duddleson (Ivan Bell) is a sleepy, slovenly, obese soldier, who is hit on the head repeatedly by Agarn for having his body in line, but not his belly, or sleeping when he is supposed to be at attention.  He is sometimes upbraided by Agarn for having gravy stains on his shirt. Duddleson typically wears a printed piece of cloth instead of the standard yellow neckerchief.  According to his service record, Duddleson was a female impersonator with a carnival in civilian life. He appears in 45 episodes.
 Trooper Hoffenmueller (John Mitchum) is a trooper who can either only speak in his native German or  speaks English with a German accent, depending upon the episode. According to his service record, Hoffenmueller can speak Cherokee, Sioux, Apache, and Hekawi. "We can use you as an interpreter ... just as soon as you learn to speak English" —Capt. Parmenter. He appears in 11 episodes. Mitchum did make an uncredited cameo in the second-season episode "The Day They Shot Agarn" as the man singing the ballad (for which singing he was credited) of the same name. John Mitchum's much more famous brother is tough-guy actor Robert Mitchum. 
 Stagecoach Driver (Rudy Doucette) briefly appears in seven episodes, including one as Slim.
 Roaring Chicken (Edward Everett Horton) is an ancient Hekawi medicine man and son of Sitting Duck. He appears in only six episodes in the first season, and he "invented" the RoarChick test (a parody of the Rorschach test). Longtime veteran actor Horton parodied the role on the 1960s Batman TV series as "Chief Screaming Chicken". Horton was also the narrator of Fractured Fairy Tales, a popular segment of the Rocky and Bullwinkle cartoon series. 
 Pete (Benny Baker), the bartender at the saloon, appears in five episodes.
 Charlie is the town drunk (veteran stuntman Harvey Parry and Frank McHugh). Fort Courage got Charlie from Dodge City. As Capt. Parmenter says: "We were lucky to get him – Dodge had a spare", and "We're all proud of you Charlie; you're the fastest drunk in the West". The role was created especially for Parry to show off his skills (he was in his 60s by then, but appears in only three episodes). In "Will the Real Captain Try to Stand Up", Charlie (McHugh) temporarily pretends to be the captain of F Troop, while Charlie's daughter, Cindy Charles (Linda Foster), is visiting because she thinks he actually is the captain of F Troop rather than the town drunk.
 Major Duncan (James Gregory) is Captain Parmenter's superior from the territory headquarters, who usually "brings a saddlebag full of trouble," according to O'Rourke. According to the episode "Too Many Cooks Soil the Troop", Major Duncan had taken F Troop's quartermaster, clerk, blacksmith, and cook as transfers to his own fort. Gregory appeared twice as Major Duncan and once as the land baron Big Jim Parker who bought the town and the land the fort sits on.
 Secretary of War (William Woodson) appears in three episodes.
 Trooper Leonard "Wrongo" Starr (Henry Gibson) is a jinxed soldier (the name is a play on Beatles drummer Ringo Starr). He appears in "Wrongo Starr and the Lady in Black" and in "The Return of Wrongo Starr." Alternative explanations are given for the origin of the jinx.
 Medicine Man (J. Pat O'Malley) is an unnamed Hekawi "doctor", who prescribes various tribal dances to treat diverse ailments. He appears in two episodes.

Guest stars
Many established actors and comedians appeared as guest stars in the series, including Bernard Fox (as the master of disguise, British Major Bently Royce), Don Rickles (as the crazy renegade Indian Bald Eagle, son of Chief Wild Eagle), Jack Elam (as the outlaw gunfighter Sam Urp), John Dehner (as conman Prof. Cornelius Clyde), Lee Meriwether (as Lily O'Reilly who is out to take over the town saloon), Jamie Farr (as Geronimo's friend and standup comic Standup Bull), George Gobel (as Wrangler Jane's cousin Henry Terkel, whose inventions parody the telephone, radio, and steam automobile), Pat Harrington Jr. (as secret agent "B. Wise" – an imitation of Don Adams's character on Get Smart), Zsa Zsa Gabor (as the Gypsy Marika), Willard Waterman (as former Capt. Bill "Cannonball" McCormick, F Troop's first commanding officer), Paul Petersen (as Wild Eagle's nephew and Sitting Bull's sharpshooting son Johnny Eagle Eye), Paul Lynde (as the phony singing Canadian Mountie Sgt. Ramsden), Harvey Korman (as the wacky Prussian Col. Heindreich von Zeppel), Milton Berle (as Wise Owl), Julie Newmar (as the long lost Indian daughter Yellow Bird), Jacques Aubuchon (as Gideon D. Jeffries her real father), Jay Novello (as Emilio Barberini), Sterling Holloway (as nearsighted Sheriff Pat Lawton), Mako (as a Samurai warrior), Phil Harris (as the 147-year old warmongering chief, Flaming Arrow), Vincent Price (as the spooky Count Sforza), and Cliff Arquette (Charley Weaver – as Gen. Sam Courage).

Other notable and well-known character actors who appeared in the series are (usually only once or twice): Henry Brandon (as a chief of the vicious, but fictitious, Shug Indian tribe), Jay Sheffield (as Lt. Jefferson Hawkes), Alan Hewitt (as Col. Malcolm), Don "Red" Barry (as Col. Donnely), Willis Bouchey (as Col. Herman Saunders), Forrest Lewis (as Doc. Emmett), Vic Tayback and Robert G. Anderson (as the notorious Colton Brothers), Linda Marshall (as Parmenter's old girlfriend from Philadelphia), Laurie Sibbald (as Flying Sparrow and Silver Dove), John Stephenson (as General Custer), Nydia Westman (as Dobb's mother), Patrice Wymore (as Laura Lee and Peggy Gray), Parley Baer (as Col. Watkins), MaKee K. Blaisdell (as War Cloud), Jackie Joseph (as Agarn's old girlfriend Betty Lou MacDonald), Mike Mazurki (as a very big Geronimo), Tony Martinez (as Felipe), Del Moore (as Dapper Dan Fulbright), Andrew Duggan (as the Indian-hating Major Chester Winster, inventor of the Chestwinster 76 rifle – a parody of the famous Winchester 73 rifle), Abbe Lane (as the beautiful counterspy Lorelei Duval), Jackie Loughery (as the Gypsy Tanya), Marjorie Bennett (as Ella Vorhees), Eve McVeagh (as Wilma McGee, O'Rourke's old girlfriend from Steubenville, Ohio and now a widow woman from Brooklyn, NY), Ben Gage (as Mike O'Hanlon), Richard Reeves (as Jim Sweeney, O'Rourke's old friend), Victor Jory (as Apache Chief Mean Buffalo), James Griffith (as sharpshooting Sgt. Crawford), Cathy Lewis (as Whispering Breeze, mother of Johnny Eagle Eye, wife of Sitting Bull and sister to Wild Eagle), Les Brown, Jr (as Lt. Mark Harrison), George Barrows (as Pecos), Paul Sorensen (as Tombstone), Mary Young (as the Widow O'Brien), Charles Lane (as Mr. S. A. MacGuire), Don Beddoe (as the Hermit), Lew Parker (as George C. Bragan), Tol Avery (as Derby Dan McGurney), Tommy Farrell (as Jenks), Richard X. Slattery (as Col. William Bartlett), Joby Baker (as Mario Maracucci), Letícia Román (as Gina Barberini), I. Stanford Jolley (as Col. Ferguson), George Furth (as Capt. Jonathan W. Blair), Pepper Curtis (as Lily), Peter Leeds (as Mr Larson), Victor French (as the deserter Cpl. Matt Delaney), Fred Clark (as Major Hewitt), Arch Johnson (as Col. Adams), Mary Wickes (as marriage broker Samantha Oglesby), Joyce Jameson (as Sally Tyler), and Charles Drake (as Major Terence McConnell). Lowell George, later the leader of the rock group Little Feat, appeared with his earlier band The Factory on an episode as a group called the Bedbugs. William Conrad was the uncredited voice announcer in the first episode "Scourge of the West".

Development and production
Although the show's opening credits claim F Troop was created by Richard Bluel, a final arbitration by the Writers Guild of America eventually gave Seaman Jacobs, Ed James, and Jim Barnett credit.

Episode writers included Arthur Julian (who, alone, wrote 29 of the 65 episodes; he also appeared as an undertaker in his "Survival of the Fittest" script), Stan Dreben (Green Acres), Seaman Jacobs, Howard Merrill (The Dick Van Dyke Show), Ed James, Austin and Irma Kalish, and the highly successful comedy writing duo of Tom Adair and James B. Allardice, who collaborated on some of the most successful American TV sitcoms of the 1960s, including The Munsters; My Three Sons; Gomer Pyle, USMC, and Hogan's Heroes.

The series was directed by Charles Rondeau and Leslie Goodwins, among many others, and produced by William T. Orr and Hy Averback. I. Stanford Jolley, Forrest Tucker's former father-in-law, appeared as Colonel Ferguson in the 1966 episode "Survival of the Fittest". The entire series was shot on the Warner Bros. backlot in Burbank, California.

The plot engine of O'Rourke and Agarn's moneymaking schemes echoed that of an American television series of the late 1950s, The Phil Silvers Show, which had featured swindling by the wily Sergeant Bilko, also based at a "peacetime" Army base — albeit in the mid-20th century, although with the twist of involving local preindustrial aboriginals with US military men in money-making schemes. It also echoes some of the money-making schemes found in the American television series McHale's Navy, which was written by some of the same writers from the Bilko show.

The concept of misfit troops sent out West bears some resemblance to the 1964 Western comedy Advance to the Rear.

Melody Patterson lied about her age to get the part of Wrangler Jane. She was 15 at the time of her audition, but turned 16 by the time filming started. As a result, the romance between Jane and Parmenter was kept very low key during the first season. By the time production of the second season started, Patterson had turned 17 and Parmenter's affections were made stronger and Jane was made more sexually aggressive (Patterson was 10 days short of turning 18 when the last episode was aired).

The show's ratings were still healthy after the second year (ranked number 40 out of 113 shows for the 1966–67 season, with a 31.3 share), but according to Tucker, Warner Bros.' new owners, Seven Arts, discontinued production because they thought it was wasteful for so much of the Warner Ranch to be taken up by a single half-hour TV show. Producer William Orr says the studio was also unhappy with the added costs of producing the show in color during its second season.

Release

Broadcast and syndication 

Although only two seasons were produced, F Troop enjoyed a healthy second life in syndication. The show was a particular favorite on Nick at Nite in the 1990s, running from 1991 to 1995 despite an archive of only 65 episodes.  Reruns began airing on TV Land from 1997 to 2000, GoodLife TV Network in 2004, and on Me-TV on September 2, 2013. Circle has carried the show since 2020. In the United Kingdom, reruns commenced in October 2017 on Sky TV channel Forces TV.

Reruns premiered on the ITV network in the United Kingdom on October 29, 1968, and were screened repeatedly until July 16, 1974. The series was also broadcast nationally in Australia on ABC-TV, in Ireland on Telefís Éireann, and in Italy during the '80s as a "filler" show during summers (when ratings usually dropped due to large numbers of people going on holidays).

Home media 
In 1998, 30 of the series' 65 episodes were digitally remastered and released on 10 VHS tapes by Columbia House.

On September 27, 2005, Warner Home Video released the first F Troop DVD compilation as part of its "Television Favorites" series. The six-episode DVD included three black-and-white episodes and three color episodes. Following the successful sales from the "Television Favorites" sampler release, Warner Home Video released F Troop: The Complete First Season, with all 34 black-and-white episodes included. The Complete Second Season of F Troop was released on DVD on May 29, 2007. Both seasons of this show have been released on DVD by Warner Home Video.  The DVD features interviews with original F Troop members, writers, and other production personnel, as well as behind-the-scenes information. However, only one major actor from the series, Ken Berry, was interviewed for the half-hour special. Also, audio segments were included of an interview with actor Joe Brooks (Private Vanderbilt).

The complete series has been released on iTunes in both standard-definition and remastered high-definition television. For the high-definition remaster, the original film elements were rescanned into high-resolution video.

References

External links
 
 

1965 American television series debuts
1967 American television series endings
1960s American sitcoms
Television series set in the 1860s
American Broadcasting Company original programming
Black-and-white American television shows
English-language television shows
Military comedy television series
Television series by Warner Bros. Television Studios
1960s Western (genre) television series